Thagona is a genus of moths in the subfamily Lymantriinae. The genus was erected by Heinrich Benno Möschler in 1883.

Species
Thagona amalita (Schaus, 1921) southern Brazil
Thagona begga (Stoll, [1781]) Suriname
Thagona bilinea (Schaus, 1904) Guyana
Thagona caramata (Dognin, 1920) Ecuador
Thagona crassilinea (Dognin, 1923) French Guiana
Thagona distincta (H. Druce, 1906) Peru
Thagona elmira Schaus, 1927 Bolivia
Thagona errans (Schaus, 1920) Guatemala
Thagona fusca (H. Druce, 1906) Peru
Thagona grisea (Schaus, 1896) São Paulo in Brazil
Thagona hedila (H. Druce, 1906) Peru
Thagona impura (Schaus, 1896) São Paulo in Brazil
Thagona limula (Dognin, 1923) Amazonas in Brazil
Thagona lojana Schaus, 1927 Ecuador
Thagona mentor (Dyar, 1910) French Guiana
Thagona modificata (H. Druce, 1906) Peru
Thagona nigrisparsus (Butler, 1878) Amazonas in Brazil
Thagona nivea (Stoll, [1780]) Suriname
Thagona nox (H. Druce, 1906) Peru
Thagona ochreata (Schaus, 1915) southern Brazil
Thagona parmata (H. Druce, 1906) Brazil
Thagona partalba (Schaus, 1915) southern Brazil
Thagona parthenica (Dyar, 1910) Guyana
Thagona persimilis Draudt, 1927
Thagona postropaea (Dyar, 1914) French Guiana
Thagona punctifimbriata (Dognin, 1923) Colombia
Thagona punctuada (Dognin, 1894) Ecuador
Thagona pura (Walker, 1856) Panama, Amazonas in Brazil
Thagona roseidorsum (Schaus, 1915) south-eastern Brazil
Thagona rufidorsata (H. Druce, 1906) Peru
Thagona suppura (Dyar, 1910) French Guiana
Thagona tarsalis (Walker, 1855) Pará in Brazil
Thagona taus (Dyar, 1910) French Guiana
Thagona tibialis (Walker, 1855) Guatemala, Honduras, Panama
Thagona unicolor (Schaus, 1920) Paraná in Brazil
Thagona uniformis Möschler, 1883 Suriname, French Guiana
Thagona unilinea (Dognin, 1916) Guyana, Amazonas in Brazil
Thagona votis (Schaus, 1920) Guatemala

References

Lymantriini